Haddington was a royal burgh that returned one commissioner to the Parliament of Scotland and to the Convention of Estates.

After the Acts of Union 1707, Haddington, North Berwick, Dunbar, Jedburgh and Lauder formed the Haddington district of burghs, returning one member between them to the House of Commons of Great Britain.

List of burgh commissioners

 1661–63, 1665 convention, 1667 convention: William Seton, provost 
 1669–74: John Hay, sheriff-depute of East Lothian 
 1678 (convention): William Lamb, merchant, bailie 
 1681–82: Harie Cockburn, merchant, provost 
 1685–86, 1689(convention), 1689: John Sleich, provost (died c.1689)
 1690–95: James Lauder, baillie  (died c.1695) 
 1696–1701, 1702–07: Alexander Edgar, former provost

See also
 List of constituencies in the Parliament of Scotland at the time of the Union

References

Constituencies of the Parliament of Scotland (to 1707)
Politics of East Lothian
History of East Lothian
Constituencies disestablished in 1707
1707 disestablishments in Scotland
Haddington, East Lothian